Mourad Guerri (born 8 January 1975) is an Algerian alpine skier. He competed in three events at the 1992 Winter Olympics.

References

External links
 

1975 births
Living people
Algerian male alpine skiers
Olympic alpine skiers of Algeria
Alpine skiers at the 1992 Winter Olympics
Place of birth missing (living people)
21st-century Algerian people